Tianmenshan Temple is a Buddhist temple located in Tianmen Mountain of Zhangjiajie, Hunan, China. The temple is built within grounds of some  area.

History
Tianmenshan Temple was built in Tang Dynasty (AD 870), and it was named "Lingquan Temple". During the Republic of China, it was destroyed by war.  After 1949, the local government rebuilt the temple. On June 8, 2009, one of the Gautama Buddha's Śarīra was stored in here.

Architecture
 Mahavira Hall
 Guanyin Pavilion
 Hall of Four Heavenly Kings
 Buddhist Texts Library
 Bell Tower
 Drum Tower

Gallery

References

External links

Buddhist temples in Hunan
Buildings and structures in Zhangjiajie
Tourist attractions in Zhangjiajie
9th-century establishments in China
9th-century Buddhist temples
Religious buildings and structures completed in 870